The Evidence Act 1950, is a Malaysian set of laws which were enacted to define the law of evidence.

Structure
The Evidence Act 1950, in its current form (1 January 2006), consists of 3 Parts containing 11 chapters, 167 sections and no schedule (including 9 amendments).
Part I: Relevancy
Chapter I: Preliminary
Chapter II: Relevancy of Facts
General
Admissions and Confessions
Statements by Persons who cannot be called as Witnesses
Statements made under Special Circumstances
How much of a Statement to be proved
Judgments of Courts when relevant
Opinions of Third Persons when relevant
Character when relevant
Part II: Proof
Chapter III: Facts which need not be proved
Chapter IV: Oral Evidence
Chapter V: Documentary Evidence
Public Documents
Presumptions as to Documents
Documents Produced by a Computer
Chapter VI: Exclusion of Oral by Documentary Evidence
Part III: Production and Effect of Evidence
Chapter VII: Burden of Proof
Chapter VIII: Estoppel
Chapter IX: Witnesses
Chapter X: Examination of Witnesses
Chapter XI: Improper Admission and Rejection of Evidence

See also
Evidence Act

References

External links
 Evidence Act 1950 

1950 in Malaya
Legal history of British Malaya
1950 in law
Malaysian federal legislation